"And I" is a song written by American R&B singer Ciara, and produced by Adonis Shropshire for Ciara's first album, Goodies (2004). It was released as the album's fourth and final single on August 15, 2005. "In July 2005, Ciara had mentioned in interviews that the album's fourth single would "most likely be "Thug Style" or "Pick Up the Phone" - or maybe even "And I"", with "And I" being the final choice.

Chart performance
At the time of the US release of "And I", Ciara's collaboration with Bow Wow, "Like You", and her collaboration with Missy Elliott, "Lose Control", were at the height of their popularity. "And I" peaked at 96 on the US Billboard Hot 100 and 27 on Billboard's Hot R&B/Hip-Hop Singles & Tracks chart, which were poor positions compared to those attained by the first three singles from the album Goodies. It was not released outside North America because of this.

Music video
The music video for "And I", directed by the Fat Cats, is loosely based on the 1992 film The Bodyguard with Kevin Costner and Whitney Houston. It takes place in a forest and on the set of a music video. Carmelo Anthony, playing Ciara's boyfriend, is flirting with another woman while Ciara is filming her music video. When Ciara's bodyguard takes her to visit her boyfriend in her trailer, he opens the door and sees the boyfriend kissing another woman. The bodyguard tells her not to go inside. When she realizes he has been cheating on her, Ciara sits on a log under lights that have been rigged to fall on her. (Earlier in the video, a man had been acting strangely whilst Ciara was signing autographs.) Her bodyguard saves her just before the lights fall and Ciara holds him in her arms.

Format and track listing
Promotional CD
"And I" (Album version)
"And I" (Instrumental)

Charts

References

External links
 Ciara Credits 'Oh' Co-Star Luda With Showing Her The Ropes
Ciara Gets Help From Carmelo Anthony And A Horse For Next Video

2004 songs
2005 singles
Ciara songs
Contemporary R&B ballads
Songs written by Ciara
Songs written by Adonis Shropshire
LaFace Records singles
Sony BMG singles
2000s ballads